Siltbreeze is an American independent record label based in Philadelphia. It is known for its eclectic roster of artists and releases of experimental, noise, folk, and rock-based music. Founded in 1989 by Ohio native Tom Lax, the label evolved out of a zine of the same name which he published from 1987 until 1992. The first label release was a Halo of Flies EP, and soon after, Lax produced a steady stream of record releases by The Dead C, The Gibson Bros., Sebadoh, The Strapping Fieldhands, Harry Pussy, Jim Shepard, and Mike Rep among others throughout the early and mid 1990s.

The label slowed its output toward the later 1990s until the mid and late 2000s. This proved to be a second boom for the label, during which Lax released records by a new crop of artists including Times New Viking, Sic Alps, Pink Reason, Psychedelic Horseshit, U.S. Girls, and Eat Skull.

Roster
1929
A Band
Above Ground
A Handful of Dust
Alasehir
Amanda X
Ashtabula
Ashtray Navigations
Axemen
Bardo Pond
Beyond The Implode
Blank Realm
Blues Control
Bren't Lewiis Ensemble
Brother JT & Vibrolux
Sarah Mary Chadwick
Charalambides
Chickens
Circle Pit
Constant Mongrel
The Dead C
Doozer
Eat Skull
Ex-Cocaine
Fabulous Diamonds
Factums
Far-Out Fangtooth
Mark Feehan
Alastair Galbraith
Gas
Gate
Gibson Bros
Hall Of Fame
Halo of Flies
Hank IV
Harry Pussy
Kitchens Floor
Kito Mizukumi Rouber
Alan Licht
Little Claw
Lloyd Pack
Love Is So Fast
Angus Maclise
The Mad Scene
Mantles
Max Block
Dan Melchior
Monkey 101
Roy Montgomery
Mount Carmel
Naked On The Vague
Oper'azione Nafta
People Skills
Pin Group
Pink Reason
Puffy Areolas
Psychedelic Horseshit
Queen Meanie Puss
Ratas Del Vaticano
Mike Rep & The Quotas
The Renderers
Letha Rodman-Melchior
Bruce Russell
Sam Esh & Hard Black Thing
Sandoz Lab Technicians
Sapat
Sebadoh
Scorched Earth Policy
Shadow Ring
Sic Alps
Jim Shepard
Shimmy Rivers and Canal
Strapping Fieldhands
Sunshine Super Scum
Temple Of Bon Matin
Teenage Panzerkorps (aka Der TPK)
The Terminals
Thomas Jefferson Slave Apartments
Times New Viking
Titmachine
Tower Recordings
Tropa Macaca
Tyvek
Un
U.S. Girls
Vacuum
V-3
Venom P. Stinger
Vertical Slit
Victor Dimisich Band
Watery Love
xNOBBQx
Yips

See also
 List of record labels

References

External links
Siltbreeze website

American independent record labels
Companies based in Philadelphia